The Aksu Basin is a sedimentary basin in southwestern Turkey, around the present-day Aksu river. Part of the part of the broader Antalya Basin, which is itself located within the Isparta Angle, the Aksu Basin has been infilling since Neogene times. The Aksu Basin covers some 2000 square kilometers. On the west, it is bounded by the Bey Dağları platform carbonates. To the east, the Aksu Thrust separates it from the Köprü Çay Basin.

The Aksu Basin overlies basement rocks of several types: Bey Dağları platform carbonates, Alanya Metamorphics, Antalya Nappes (made of ophiolite) and Lycian Nappes (platform carbonate). An unconformity separates the basin from these basement rocks.

The Aksu Basin is considered a foreland basin. It can be divided into two sub-basins: in the north is the older Aksu-Karpuzçay sub-basin, and in the south is the younger Yenimahalle-Çalkaya sub-basin.

There are five fan deltas in the Aksu Basin: Kapıkaya, Kozan, Karadağ, Kargı, and Bucak. There is also the Eskiköy alluvial fan.

In front of the mouth of the Aksu River, there is a broad, shallow marine shelf offshore where the present-day sediments of the Aksu River are deposited. In the past, this area was deeper; according to Poisson et al., there was likely a canyon, as there still is over by the Düden and Karaman mouths near Antalya, but this canyon has since been filled in by Quaternary deposition from the Aksu River.

Evolution 
The pre-Miocene basement primarily consisted of the Bey Dağlari platform, surrounded by the Antalya Nappes, and covered by a thin layer of Paleogene sedimentary deposition. This formed "an eroded flat surface [that] covered a large area in SW Turkey". Beginning in the Late Oligocene, and continuing through the Burdigalian, rising sea levels caused a marine transgression in the area. The shallow marine Karabayir Limestones were deposited in the north and west, forming a large platform around what is now the Aksu Basin. Meanwhile, to the south, a molassic basin was formed; this was the beginning of the Antalya Basin as a whole.

Miocene 

By the Early Miocene, a "right-lateral transform fault plate boundary" had formed between the Cyprus Trench and the Isparta Angle. This led to the creation of "a hybrid, terrestrial-shallow marine accommodation space" on the eastern side of the Isparta Angle, where sediments from the Antalya Complex further east were deposited.

In the Middle Miocene ( 16-11 MYA), the Aksu Basin was formed as a graben cutting through the Karabayir platform. Meanwhile, the surrounding continental areas were being pushed upward; erosion from these areas provided a lot of sediment that was poured into the emerging Aksu Basin. According to Kaya, this was especially the case with the rapidly uplifting Antalya Complex to the east; it "provided the topographic gradient and gravitational potential energy for the necessary fluvial erosion and transport for sediment supply". Poisson et al. instead highlight the basin's northern and western margins, where a series of fan deltas at prehistoric river mouths left thick sediment deposits – for example, the present-day Kapıkaya and Kargı fan deltas.

The Aksu and Karpuzçay Formations were deposited during this period in what Kaya describes as "fluvial, deltaic to beach environments". Coral reefs fringed the coastline. These reefs lay on a "warm, well-aerated shallow marine shelf" in the photic zone. The low species diversity – primarily colonies of Porites and Tarbaellastraea – may indicate a "stressed" environment. The shore was "medium-high wave energy-dominated", and the climate was temperate to subtropical. The presence of coral fossils among the fan delta deposits is likely from periods when sudden sea level increase left the deltas underwater. Traces of coral reefs at Kargı and Sütçüler have been dated to Late Tortonian times.

Around 5.6 MYA, the Mediterranean region was hit by the Messinian salinity crisis. Sea levels dropped tremendously, and there was rapid erosion and desiccation. Growth of the fan deltas stopped as the receding coastline left the entire Aksu Basin on land. Deep gorges were carved in the areas that were now exposed as dry land. One of them, now a deep undersea canyon in the Gulf of Antalya, is still traceable in front of the present day Düden and Karaman river mouths. A similar canyon likely existed on the Aksu, but it has since been buried by Quaternary sedimentation on the marine shelf.

Poisson et al. reconstructed the course of the Aksu River around the end of the Messinian ( 5.3 MYA) this way: the river flowed through the Eskiköy Canyon, then "crossed the Antalya alluvial plain before joining the Antalya abyssal plain, through the actively cutting Antalya canyon".

Poisson et al. also argued that the Gebiz Limestone was formed during the Messinian, implying that there was still at least a pocket of sea in the Aksu Basin even while the sea retreated. They characterize this environment as "very shallow marine", with coral reefs, which then gradually became more restricted as it gave way to land and eventually dried up completely. This characterization is disputed – Üner et al. instead describe the Gebiz Limestone as being deposited after sea levels rose again; Kaya attributes the Gebiz Limestone to the "latest Miocene-early Pliocene", describing it as being deposited by a NW-SE-oriented lake that formed during this period.

Kaya's interpretation: the Aksu Basin was a "fluvial, fluvial-delta, beach setting" during the Middle Miocene ( 16-11 MYA), then "a lacustrine and lagoon environment" by the end of the Miocene (i.e.  5.3 MYA). Then, during the early Pliocene ( 5.3-3.6 MYA), there was a relatively brief (at least geologically speaking) period of tidal flat and very shallow marine conditions. Later, there was a "return to entirely terrestrial conditions", and deposition by the ancient Aksu River formed the Belkis Conglomerate during the Pleistocene period.

Pliocene 
Sea levels rose again in the early Pliocene, during the Zanclean period ( 5.3-3.6 MYA). The southern part of the Aksu Basin was submerged, while the northern part remained dry land. The Messinian canyons became filled in by new deposition. The Eskiköy canyon was at first completely submerged, as fossils of nannoplankton and planktonic foraminifera found in marl deposits suggest a shallow, "open-marine" environment. It then became "completely filled" by these marl deposits, then deltaic conglomerate deposits, and finally lacustrine marl deposits.

Meanwhile, by the latest Miocene/early Pliocene, continued tectonic activity had caused the Aksu Basin (specifically the present-day northern part, the Aksu-Karpuzçay sub-basin) to become uplifted and tilted towards the south. Deposition was now happening further south, forming the Yenimahalle-Çalkaya sub-basin. Sediment was now coming from the Bey Dağları platform to the west, which had been uplifted in the meantime.

Rising sea levels had left the Yenimahalle-Çalkaya sub-basin underwater, leading to what Üner et al. describe as a shallow marine shelf environment. Üner et al. attribute the alluvial fan-delta of the Eskiköy Formation, and the "shallow marine siltstone-marl alternations" of the Yenimahalle Formation to this period. According to Kaya, the Yenimahalle and Çalkaya Formations were deposited during this period.

In the Late Pliocene ( 3.6-2.6 MYA), sea levels dropped and the southern Aksu Basin once again became dry land. On the western side of the basin, the Antalya Fault spawned cold springs, which produced the Antalya tufa and travertine deposits.

Quaternary 
During the Quaternary period, the Aksu River cut a new gorge – not in the same place as the Eskiköy canyon; the river's course had changed in the meantime. Also during this time, the most recent layer of the Aksu Basin was formed: the Belkis Conglomerate, in the middle Pleistocene, by fluvial terraces.

Component strata 
The stratigraphy of the Aksu Basin is well documented, although the specific delineation of formation names, ages, and boundaries are varied. This article follows Kaya's terminology.

Aksu Formation 
According to Ersin Kaya, the Aksu Formation is the oldest layer of the Aksu Basin. It is mixed with the similar-aged Karpuzçay Formation. Based on fossil records, the Aksu Formation has been dated to the Langhian through Tortonian periods (i.e.  16-7 MYA). Its maximum thickness is about 1200 m. The Aksu Formation's type localities are in the northeast and northwest parts of the Aksu Basin. The formation's composition is somewhat varied in different places. The western part of the Aksu Formation consists of "poorly sorted conglomerate and conglomeratic sandstone... composed of rounded clasts of fine-grained, beige micritic Jurassic limestone and Triassic light gray limestone and yellow sandstone". In the east, the formation contains "abundant clasts of red and green radiolarites, Triassic hallobia-bearing sandstone, and ophiolitic rocks (serpentinite, dolerite, basaltic volcanic rocks". Near the eastern edge of the basin, the Aksu Formation directly overlies the Triassic basement rocks along an angular unconformity.

Less commonly, blocks of reefal limestone are present. These blocks contain fossils of the corals Stylophora, Helliastraea, Plesiastraea, Favia, Tarbellastraea, and Porites.

Karpuzçay Formation 
With a maximum thickness of 1500 m, the Karpuzçay Formation is the single most extensive formation in the Aksu Basin. It is approximately equal in date to the Aksu Formation, also being dated to the Langhian and Tortonian based on fossils. It is either slightly older or slightly younger than the Aksu Formation; in either case, the two are mixed together in many places.

The Karpuzçay Formation mostly comprises alternating layers of conglomerate, sandstone, and mudstone. The conglomerate layers have clasts made of chert, serpentinite, and various types of limestone. Sandstones vary in color from grey to green to dirty yellow. They have cross-bedding, cross-lamination, and pronounced graded bedding. Layers of tuffaceous sandstone are commonly mixed in with conglomerate or conglomeratic sandstone layers. Mudstone layers are usually laminated and contain concretions ranging from 15 to 20 mm.

Gebiz Limestone 
The Gebiz Limestone unconformably overlies the Karpuzçay Formation at its type locality near the town of Gebiz in the southeastern part of the Aksu Basin. In some places along the basin's eastern edge, it is instead faulted against the Triassic-Jurassic rocks of the Antalya Complex. More within the basin, it is faulted against younger basement strata in some places. It is dated to the Upper Miocene, although the exact time period is disputed. It is variously dated to the Messinian or Tortonian. Its maximum thickness is about 40 m, in its type locality near the town of Gebiz. The Gebiz Limestone consists mainly of bioclastic limestone, marl, claystone, and mudstone. In some areas, there are reefal limestone deposits.

The largest continuous exposed stretch of the Gebiz Limestone lies along the southeastern edge of the Aksu Basin; it runs parallel to the edge of the basin.

Eskiköy Formation 
The main exposed outcroppings of the Eskiköy Formation are found in the middle part of the basin. Here, it generally sits on top of the Aksu and Karpuzçay Formations, separated from them by an unconformity. In some places, it instead lies on top of Triassic-Jurassic recrystallized limestones belonging to the Antalya Complex, either separated from them by an unconformity or faulted against them.

The Eskiköy Formation primarily consists of sandy conglomerate and sandstone, with interspersed layers of mudstone. The conglomerate is "poorly sorted with mostly rounded pebbles and clasts of Jurassic micritic limestone, and Triassic chert and basaltic rocks". The formation's maximum depth is estimated at 300 m.

Akay et al. interpreted the Eskiköy Formation as a lateral equivalent of the Gebiz Limestone, meaning that they date from the same time.

Fossils found in the Eskiköy Formation's marl include several species of planktonic foraminifera: Orbulina, Biorbulina, Globigerinoides (multiple species: trilobus, obliquus extremus, obliquus s.s., bollii, emeisi, and aperture), and Globigerinita incrusta. Based on these planktonic foraminifera fossils, Poisson et al. dated the formation to the Upper Miocene, which is consistent with Akay et al.'s interpretation.

Yenimahalle Formation 
The Yenimahalle Formation is best exposed in two areas: around Yenimahalle in the southwestern part of the Aksu River valley, and around Gebiz in the east. It lies conformably on top of the Gebiz and Eskiköy Formations; i.e. they are not separated by an unconformity. The Çalkaya Formation sits on top of it. Around the village of Dorumlar, the Yenimahalle Formation is overlain by the Belkis Conglomerate, with an unconformity between them. The total thickness of the Yenimahalle Formation is about 250 m.

The Yenimahalle Formation is made up of "blue-grey siltstone with embedded sandstone and graded gravelstone". There is also conglomerate included in the formation's upper layers. Characteristic features of the Yenimahalle formation include "low-angle cross-bedding and lamination, trough cross-bedding, ripple lamination, fining upwards sand channels, and gravel/conglomerate lenses". In some places, sandstone concretions are common.

The presence of "Margaritae and Punctulate zones" in lower parts of the formation near Gebiz indicate that the formation can be dated to the Lower Pliocene. A number of fossilized bivalve and gastropod mollusk shells have been found in the Yenimahalle Formation, including Acanthocardia, Ostrea, Cerastoderma edule, Paphia, Dentalis, Gibbula, Fusinus, and Pectens. Glover and Robertson interpreted the Yenimahalle Formation as "the product of a shallow marine environment".

Çalkaya Formation 
The Çalkaya Formation rests on top of the Yenimahalle Formation and consists of marly siltstone, sandstone, and conglomerate. Its lower part is similar in composition to the upper part of the Yenimahalle Formation. Siltstone layers in the Çalkaya Formation are interspersed with coal seams measuring 25–30 cm in thickness. Common features of the Çalkaya Formation include "low-angle cross-bedding, through cross-bedding, ripple lamination, and hummocky cross-stratification. In some places, the sediment's grain size increases significantly as it goes towards upper layers, getting coarser and eventually giving way to conglomerate. Glover and Robertson interpreted the Çalkaya Formation as "a combination of the Pliocene Alakilise and Eskiköy Formations", but Kaya interpreted it as a separate formation since there is "no observable direct contact between them".

The presence of pebbles "bored by sponges and marine bivalves" led Glover and Robertson to conclude that the Çalkaya Formation, like the Yenimahalle Formation below it, was marine in origin. Fossils found in the Çalkaya include foraminifera, ostracods, and "abundant" bivalve and gastropod mollusks. These are similar to the Yenimahalle Formation, and the Çalkaya Formation has been dated to the Pliocene or Upper Pliocene.

Tufa deposits 
The southwestern boundary of the Aksu Basin is marked by a 30 km by 40 km area of tufa and travertine deposits. This area includes the city of Antalya as well as an undersea portion submerged beneath the Gulf of Antalya. The deposits get progressively thicker towards the west — from 30 m thick in the east to 250 m thick in the west. No absolute age is given for these deposits, but they lie conformably on top of the Çalkaya Formation. The lowermost tufa deposits are made of "clay-rich microcrystalline carbonates, containing gastropod and algal fossils". Two sets of "conjugate oblique-slip faults" run northwest–southeast and northeast–southwest along the length of the entire formation.

These deposits were formed by cold springs in the early Pleistocene.

Belkis Conglomerate 

The youngest unit in the Aksu Basin is the Belkis Conglomerate, which only has visible outcroppings in the basin's southern part, in the Yenimahalle-Çalkaya sub-basin. It lies unconformably on top of the Yenimahalle and Karpuzçay Formations. In composition, the Belkis Conglomerate is similar to the conglomerate portions of the Yenimahalle Formation. It is "highly heterogenous and composed mainly of clasts of Cretaceous limestone, serpentinite, and chert in a poorly sorted sandstone-siltstone matrix". The ancient city of Aspendos was built on top of the Belkis Conglomerate, and its stone structures were originally quarried from here.

The Belkis Conglomerate is Pleistocene in origin, described as "fluvial terraces", and formed by "deposition in fluvial floodplains and channels along the ancestral Aksu River, together with regional uplift". Specifically middle Pleistocene.

Other features

Eskiköy canyon 
The Eskiköy canyon, about 50 km north of Antalya, is from the pre-Pliocene. The canyon had its origins in a "faulted corridor" that the ancient Aksu River cut through. In the period preceding the Messinian salinity crisis, when sea levels felling, there was a period of erosion where the river "buried" the canyon. It is filled with "Early Pliocene fluvio-marine deposits".

Karadağ fan delta 
Located on the west side of the central part of the basin, the Karadağ fan delta (also called the Karadağ Conglomerates) dates from the Serravallian and Tortonian periods and is composed of "sandstones and gravels of limestones and ophiolitic rocks". The sources of these deposits are the Bey Dağları platform carbonates and the Antalya Nappes; for example, there are Upper Cretaceous Globotruncata fossils present in the fan delta. The gravels are "medium to poorly sorted", typically range from 3 to 8 cm in size, and are embedded in a "granule/coarse sand matrix". The base of the Karadağ fan delta is not visible because of tectonic activity since its formation. The overall thickness of the fan delta is about 750 m.

Kargı fan delta 
The Kargı fan delta is located on the Aksu Basin's western side. It is composed of "NE-dipping thick conglomerates intercalated with thin mudstones with a total thickness of 185 m". Semi-rounded pebbles of limestone and ophiolite, generally ranging between 3 and 5 cm in size, are embedded in a "granule/coarse sandy matrix". Deposits in the Kargı fan delta contain "isolated piles of patch reefs" dating from the Tortonian period, primarily consisting of "columnar-shaped, thick-bedded, vertically growing Porites lobatosepta and Tarbellastraea siliciae colonies". In some places, there are "outsized blocks" of rock representing rock fall or rock slides, with the reef deposits underneath getting crushed in the process.

Like the Karadağ fan delta, the Kargı fan delta was fed by the Bey Dağlari platform carbonates and the Antalya Nappes. Its growth mainly occurred in a north-northeast direction.

According to Üner et al., the Kargı fan delta was probably formed as a "shallow braided stream and overbank deposit that developed on a medial alluvial fan". They write that, based on the "upper succession with patch reefs", the cause of the fan delta's formation was "a sharp transgression over the alluvial fan".

Other fan deltas 
The Kapıkaya, Kozan, and Bucak fan deltas were all deposited approximately during the Langhian through Messinian periods. The Kapıkaya fan delta was fed from the northern end of the Aksu Basin; the Kozan was fed from the east side; and the Bucak was fed from the west side (like the Karadağ and Kargı ones).

Notes

References

Sedimentary basins of Asia
Geology of Turkey
Foreland basins
Landforms of Antalya Province
Valleys of Turkey